Carol Young Suh Lee (born 21 December 2001) is a Northern Mariana Islander tennis player.

Lee has a career high ITF junior combined ranking of 150 achieved on 31 December 2018 and became the first person from the Northern Mariana Islands to compete in a junior Grand Slam tournament, at the 2019 Australian Open.

Lee represents Pacific Oceania at the Fed Cup, where she has a W/L record of 5–3.

ITF Junior Finals

Singles (6–4)

Doubles (4–5)

References

External links
 
 

2001 births
Living people
Northern Mariana Islands female tennis players
People from Saipan
Northern Mariana Islands people of Korean descent
21st-century American women